A throbber, also known as a loading icon, is an animated graphical control element used to show that a computer program is performing an action in the background (such as downloading content, conducting intensive calculations or communicating with an external device). In contrast to a progress bar, a throbber does not indicate how much of the action has been completed.

Usually the throbber is found at the side of a program's toolbar or menu bar. Throbbers take various forms, but are commonly incorporated into the logo of the program. Throbbers are typically a still image (known as its resting frame), unless the program is performing an action, during which time the throbber is animated in a loop to convey to the user that the program is busy (and has not frozen). Once the action is complete, the throbber returns to its resting frame.

It is normally possible for the user to continue interacting with the program while the throbber animated; one such possibility may be to press a "stop" button to cancel the action. Clicking the throbber itself might perform another action, such as opening the program's website, or pausing or canceling the background action.

History
One of the early (if not the earliest)  uses of a throbber occurred in the NCSA Mosaic web browser of the early 1990s, which featured an NCSA logo that animated while Mosaic downloaded a web page. As the user could still interact with the program, the pointer remained normal (and not a busy symbol, such as an hourglass); therefore, the throbber provided a visual indication that the program was performing an action. Clicking on the throbber would stop the page loading; later web browsers added a separate Stop button for this purpose.

Netscape, which soon overtook Mosaic as the market-leading web browser, also featured a throbber. In version 1.0 of Netscape, this took the form of a big blue "N" (Netscape's logo at the time). The animation depicted the "N" expanding and contracting - hence the name "throbber". When Netscape unveiled its new logo (a different "N" on top of a hill), they held a competition to find an animation for it. The winning design (featuring the new-look "N" in a meteor shower) became very well known and almost became an unofficial symbol of the World Wide Web. Later, Internet Explorer's blue "e" enjoyed similar status, though it only functioned as a throbber in early versions of the browser.

The IBM WebExplorer offered a webpage the opportunity to change the look and the animation of the throbber by using proprietary HTML code. The use of web frames, a feature introduced later, leads WebExplorer to confusion on modern pages due to the way this feature was implemented.

The Arena web browser has a command-line option to change the throbber with a local file.

Initially, throbbers tended to be quite large, but they reduced in size along with the size of toolbar buttons as graphical user interfaces developed. Their usefulness declined somewhat as most operating systems introduced a different pointer to indicate "working in background", and they are no longer included in all web browsers. Furthermore, even web browsers that do use them depict images less elaborate than their predecessors. Many browsers — like Mozilla Firefox, Opera and Google Chrome — place a small annular throbber in the tab while a page is loading and replace it with the favicon of the page when loading has completed.

Often browsers shipped with ISP CDs, or those customized according to co-branding agreements, have a custom throbber. For example, the version of Internet Explorer included with AOL disks has an AOL throbber instead of the standard "e".

Spinning wheel 

Throbbers saw a resurgence with client side applications (such as Ajax web apps) where an application within the web browser would wait for some operation to complete. Most of these throbbers were known as a "spinning wheel", which typically consist of 8, 10, or 12 part-radial lines or discs arranged in a circle, as if on a clock face, highlighted in turn as if a wave is moving clockwise around the circle.

In text user interfaces, the spinning wheel is commonly replaced by a fixed-width character which is cycled between "|", "/", "-" and "\" forms in order to create an animation effect.  Unlike graphical activity indicators, the spinning bar is commonly combined with progress displays, since the lower resolution of character-based progress bars requires a separate indication of activity.  This use dates from early versions of the UNIX operating system and DR-DOS utilities in the 1980s.

See also 
 Spinning pinwheel
 Windows wait cursor

References 

Graphical control elements
Technology neologisms